La Presqu’île de Guérande (Guérande Peninsula)  is an Atlantic destination located in the North-West of France, between the Loire estuary and the mouth of the Vilaine. It encompasses about 20 towns split up into two departments: Morbihan and Loire-Atlantique.  
This area is often called Guérande Peninsula, partly because of Guérande, a scenic town that triggers off images of a medieval town and the salt marshes.

Geography

Location
Characterized by the diversity of its landscapes, La Baule – Presqu’île de Guérande is bounded by the Atlantic Ocean at the West and the South, by the mouth of the Vilaine at the North, and by the Brière marshland at the East. This area is partly covered by the Brière Nature Park, created in 1970.

Towns

La Baule – Presqu’île de Guérande is made up of these main towns and cities:

Towns located in Loire-Atlantique
 Assérac
 La Baule-Escoublac
 Batz-sur-Mer
 Le Croisic
 Guérande
 Herbignac
 Mesquer
 Piriac-sur-Mer
 Le Pouliguen
 Saint-Lyphard
 Saint-Molf
 La Turballe
 Pornichet
 Saint-André-des-Eaux
 Missillac

Towns located in Morbihan
 Camoël
 Férel
 Pénestin
 La Roche-Bernard

Adjacent cities
 Saint-Nazaire
 Pontchâteau

Traditions and points of interest
This region is known for the presence of three elements: salt, the Brière and the sea.

Salt

Famous all over the world, and especially in Japan, Guérande’s fleur de sel is the product which is emblematic of Atlantic destination La Baule – Guérande Peninsula.
Down through the centuries, the harvest and the trade of salt have sculpted not just the landscape but also the architecture of the saltworkers’villages, the ports and the areas of fortification. 
Currently, Guérande Peninsula contains about 2,000 hectares of salt marshes, divided into two salt basins: 
the Batz-Guérande basin, straddling the districts of Batz-sur-Mer, Guérande, La Turballe, Le Croisic and Le Pouliguen.
the Mès basin in the district of Saint-Molf, Assérac and Mesquer.

The Brière
The Brière gets its nickname of “Pays noir” (Black Country) from peat, formerly one of its main resources, which results from the decomposition of mosses and plant matter. Light and porous, it used to be a highly sought-after fuel. Clods of peat were cut when the level was at its lowest in mid-July. These were then formed into briquettes and left to dry on mounds in the marshes. 
The most beautiful aspects of this huge expanse of canals and wetlands, with its natural setting of freshwater marshland, the reeds providing the ideal nesting habitat for many species of birds, and its architectural heritage are best appreciated in a barge, a slender, flat-bottomed craft steered using a pole.
The points of interest are: 
The Brière Nature Park 
The specific habitat: the thatched cottages (about 3,000), especially those in the village of Kerhinet, in Saint-Lyphard
Tours by barge, horse-drawn carriage, or by walking 
Birdwatching

The sea

The bay du Pouliguen is one of the star attractions of the area. One of France’s leading large seaside resorts, this bay is also sometimes considered as the most beautiful European beach. The main beach is split between three cities: La Baule, Pornichet and Le Pouliguen.
Beaches of Batz-sur-Mer, La Turballe, Mesquer and Pénestin
The fishing ports of Le Croisic and La Turballe

Other points of interest
The medieval centre of Guérande (and its city walls)
Le Croisic, Piriac-sur-Mer, La Roche-Bernard: labelled as “petites cités de caractère” (small towns of character) 
La Baule and its villas

Gastronomy
Guérande’s fleur de sel
Salicornia and seafood
Salted caramel candy
Creperies, and other traditional food 
Saveurs d’octobre (October flavours), a food festival each year in October

See also
Guérande
La Baule-Escoublac
Brière
Communes of the Loire-Atlantique department
Communes of the Morbihan department

References

External links
Official site of La Baule – Presqu’île de Guérande (in English)
A article on Guérande fleur de sel (in English)
Official site of Brière Nature Park (in English)

Morbihan